Beatrice of Burgundy (or Beatrix of Burgundy) may refer to :
 Beatrice I, Countess of Burgundy (1143–1184), Countess Palatine of Burgundy (1148–1184) and Holy Roman Empress
 Beatrice II, Countess of Burgundy (1193–1231), Countess Palatine of Burgundy (1205–1231)
 Beatrice of Burgundy, Lady of Bourbon (1257–1310), heiress of all Bourbon estates